The Parks Regulation (Amendment) Act 1926 was an Act of the United Kingdom, amending the Parks Regulation Act 1872. It altered the earlier Act's remit from "all parks, gardens, recreation grounds, open spaces and other land" managed or controlled by the "Commissioners of Her Majesty's Works and Public Buildings" to those managed or controlled by the "Commissioners of Works" (or in the case of Kew Gardens the Minister of Agriculture and Fisheries), though the provisions of the 1872 Act's First Schedule were only to apply to parks where they had already been in effect immediately before the 1926 Act came into effect (Section 1). It also transferred the regulation-making powers of the 1872 Acts to the Commissioners of Works and the Minister of Agriculture and Fisheries (Section 2).

References

Police legislation in the United Kingdom

Linlithgow
Scottish monarchy
Royal Botanic Gardens, Kew
United Kingdom Acts of Parliament 1926